Abraham Coles (December 26, 1813 – May 3, 1891) was an American physician, translator, author and poet from New Jersey. He published Dies Irae (1859), Stabat Mater Dolorosa (1865), Stabat Mater Speciosa (1866), Old Gems in New Settings (1866), The Microcosm (1866, 1881), The Evangel in Verse (1874) and The Light of the World (1884).

References

External links 
 
 
 

1813 births
1891 deaths
Physicians from New Jersey
People from Scotch Plains, New Jersey
19th-century American poets
American male poets
Poets from New Jersey
19th-century American translators
19th-century American male writers